The British Athletics Writers' Association (BAWA) is an organisation of British journalists who cover athletics. BAWA was founded in 1963 to represent the press covering the sport. It organises the BAWA Awards and is recognised by the International Association of Athletics Federations and the Sports Journalists' Association.

Current Leadership 
The current leadership team of BAWA for the period 2019-2020 includes:

 Chair: Ben Bloom, The Daily Telegraph
 Secretary: Jason Henderson, Athletics Weekly
 Treasurer: Tony Barden
 Committee: Mark Woods, The Scotsman; Jessica Whittington, Athletics Weekly

Past Chairs

Awards Luncheon 
The Association has held an annual luncheon to recognise achievements in the sport since 1963 and award the BAWA Athlete of the Year trophy. It has been attended by notable figures including IAAF president Sebastian Coe. The luncheon, where the winners are announced, is held in November at the Tower Hotel in London.

Previous winners of the BAWA Athlete of the Year Award have included four-time Olympic champion Mo Farah and two-time Olympic champion Dame Jessica Ennis-Hill, who have both been recognised with the trophy on numerous occasions. Former Olympic champions Greg Rutherford MBE and Jonathan Edwards CBE have also been recognised.

References 

Sports journalism organizations in Europe
Journalism-related professional associations
Professional associations based in the United Kingdom
Sports organisations of the United Kingdom